The Art Box is a six-CD box set by English avant-rock group Art Bears. It contains all Art Bears album and single releases, plus new material, including live and unreleased Art Bears tracks, and unreleased remixes and reworkings of Art Bears material by other musicians. The box set also contains a book of photographs, artwork, articles, interviews and commentary on the CD tracks, the work process, the band and their tour of Europe in 1979. The Art Bears material was recorded between 1978 and 1980, while the work by other musicians was recorded between 1998 and 2003. The box set was released in 2004 to commemorate the 25th anniversary of the band's formation. A double-CD entitled Art Bears Revisited containing Discs four and five of the box set was released later in 2004.

Discs one, two and three are remastered versions (by Bob Drake) of the first three Art Bears albums, Hopes and Fears (1978), Winter Songs (1979) and The World as It Is Today (1981). Discs four and five, entitled Art Bears Revisited, contain remixed and reworked Art Bears pieces by various musicians, plus two Art Bears singles and an unreleased Art Bears track. Disc six contains more remixed and reworked Art Bears pieces by various musicians, including a 1984 cover of "The Song of Investment Capital Overseas" by Duck and Cover, plus five live Art Bears tracks, four of which were never officially released before.

Reception

Dave Lynch at AllMusic described Art Bears' music as "an adventurous mix of avant rock experimentalism, smatterings of noise and dissonance, British folk flavors, medieval imagery, and leftist, anti-corporate politics". He said that The Art Box "is a comprehensive document of a band that represented what the best rock music should be: utterly uncompromising". Dominique Leone wrote in Pitchfork Media that Art Bears made music "almost as ahead of the curve today as it did twenty years ago", and said that they deserve the "deluxe reissue treatment" of a 6-CD box set. In a review at BBC Music, Peter Marsh wrote that Art Bears "recorded some of the most carefully crafted (and indeed timeless) music you're ever likely to hear". He added that while he felt that many of the remixes "seem unnecessary at best", he liked the live tracks where Art Bears perform songs "never meant to be performed". Marsh particularly liked Fred Frith's guitar solo on "Coda to Man and Boy".

Art Bears personnel
Fred Frith – guitars, violin, viola, harmonium, xylophone, keyboards, bass guitar
Chris Cutler – drums, percussion, noise
Dagmar Krause – voice

Disc 1: Hopes and Fears
Contains all the tracks from the original release of the first Art Bears album, Hopes and Fears (1978)

Track list

Additional personnel
Tim Hodgkinson (tracks 1–5, 9–12) – organ, clarinet, piano on "The Pirate Song"
Lindsay Cooper (tracks 1–6, 8–12) – bassoon, oboe, soprano, recorder
Georgie Born (tracks 1–5, 9–12) – bass guitar, cello, vocals on "Maze"

Recording information
Tracks 1–5, 9–12: recorded by Henry Cow at Sunrise Studio, Switzerland, 15–29 January 1978
Tracks 6–8, 13: recorded by Art Bears at Kaleidophon Studios, London, 15–18 March 1978

Disc 2: Winter Songs
Contains all the tracks from the original release of the second Art Bears album, Winter Songs (1979)

Track list
All tracks composed by Fred Frith and Chris Cutler.

Recording information
Recorded at Sunrise Studio, Switzerland, 22 November – 5 December 1978

Disc 3: The World as It Is Today
Contains all the tracks from the original release of the third Art Bears album, The World as It Is Today (1981)

Track list
All tracks composed by Fred Frith and Chris Cutler.

Recording information
Recorded at Sunrise Studio, Switzerland, August–September 1980

Disc 4: Art Bears Revisited disc 1
Contains remixed and reworked Art Bears pieces by various musicians, plus two Art Bears singles (tracks 17–18)

Track list

Additional personnel
Jon Rose (track 1) – violin, piano
Elio Martusciello (track 2)
Maurizio Martusciello (track 2)
Fabrizio Spera (track 2) – drums
Luca Venitucci (track 2)
Sachiko M (track 3) – sine-wave sampling
Eto Naoko (track 3) – prepared piano
Kikuchi Naruyoshi (track 3) – tenor saxophone
Yasushi Utsunomiya (track 11) – sub vocal
Kiyomi Yamada (track 11) – vocal, violin, fieldworks
Tetsuji Hayashi (track 11) – shou, hichiriki
Kouryu Koukiji (track 11) – sub vocal
Sakura Koukiji (track 11) – dog voice
Mitsutarou Inagaki (track 11) – honey bee sound
Herb Heinz (track 12) – Midi boxes, guitar
Martin Archer (track 13) – digital piano, electronics
Jocelyn Robert (track 16) – field recordings

Recording information
Track 1: recorded Summer 1998
Track 2: recorded live at Roma, 1979 (Art Bears tracks); live at Bourges, May 1998; at Roma, December 1998
Track 3: recorded at GOK Sound, Tokyo, 10 November 1998
Track 4: recorded at Massimo Simonini's home, January 2000
Track 5: recorded at M.O.R.I.A., Oslo, February 1999
Track 6: recorded, March 1999
Track 7: recorded, March 1999
Track 8: recorded, January 1996
Track 9: recorded at Loa Studios and Fx Studio, Milano, January 2000
Track 10: recorded, January 2000
Track 11: recorded at Studio Nirvana, 2000
Track 12: recorded at IS Productions, Oakland, California, July 2000
Track 13: recorded at Telecottage & Sound Kitchen Studios, Sheffield, Summer 2000
Track 14: recorded, August 2000
Track 15: recorded at Tonstudio Jankowski, Stuttgart, 13 July 2000
Track 16: recorded at CannedGods Mobile, September 2000
Tracks 17–18: recorded at Kaleidophon Studios, London, Winter 1979

Disc 5: Art Bears Revisited disc 2
Contains remixed and reworked Art Bears pieces by various musicians, plus an unfinished Art Bears piece, completed for the box set (track 18)

Track list

Additional personnel
Bob Drake (track 2) – Solina organ bass pedals
Andrea Rocca (track 3) – ambient noises, electric guitar
Vitor Rua (track 4) – bass flute, prepared piano, virtual orchestra, electronics
Stevan Tickmayer (track 5) – virtual instruments
Brian Woodbury (track 6) – bass guitar, piano, Microkorg synthesizer/Vocoder, Roland XV-3080 module, vocals

Recording information
Track 1: recorded, 22 January 2003
Tracks 2,7: recorded at Studio Midi-Pyrenees, Summer 2003
Track 3: recorded at Roma, Summer 2003
Track 4: recorded at Telectu's Studio, Lisboa, September 2003
Track 5: recorded at The Rusty Scupper, Los Angeles, August 2003
Track 6: recorded at Studio Midi-Pyrenees, September 2003
Track 8: recorded in Stevan Tickmayer's work room, April 2003
Track 9-11: recorded at the Djerassi Artist's Residency Program, Woodside, California, Autumn 2002
Track 12–15: recorded at Dys Studio, Bellvue, Colorado, Spring/Summer 2001 and Fall/Winter 2002/2003, edited, January 2003 at Eye In The Sky, Laporte, Colorado
Track 16: recorded, August 2003
Track 17: recorded at Noise Media, Brooklyn, Summer 2003
Track 18: recorded at Sunrise Studio, Switzerland, November/December 1978, at Tonstudio Jankowski, Stuttgart, 13 July 2000 and at Studio Midi-Pyrenees, 29 June 2003

Disc 6: Free Box CD
Contains remixed and reworked Art Bears pieces by various musicians, plus five live Art Bears pieces (tracks 4–7,11)

Track list

Additional personnel
Tom Cora (track 2) – bass guitar
Heiner Goebbels (track 2) – piano, synthesizer
Alfred Harth (track 2) – tenor saxophone
George Lewis (track 2) – trombone
Marc Hollander (tracks 4–7,11) – keyboards
Peter Blegvad (tracks 4–7,11) – bass guitar
Kiyomi Yamada (track 10) – vocal, violin, fieldworks
Mariko Ohkubo (track 10) – shamisen

Recording information
Track 1: recorded at Studio Midi-Pyrenees, Summer 2003
Track 2: recorded live at the Brecht Ensemble, East Berlin, 16 February 1984
Track 3: recorded March 1999
Tracks 4–7: recorded live, probably at Charleville, France, 16 April 1979
Track 8: recorded at Dys Studio, Bellvue, Colorado and edited, October 2003 at Eye In The Sky, Laporte, Colorado
Track 9: recorded at Tonstudio Jankowski, Stuttgart, 13 July 2000
Track 10: recorded at Studio Nirvana, August 2001 – March 2002
Track 11: recorded live at Cantù, Italy, 30 May 1979

Art Bears Revisited
Discs 4 and 5 above were also released in 2004 on a double-CD entitled Art Bears Revisited.

References

External links

2004 compilation albums
Recommended Records compilation albums
Experimental music compilation albums
Art Bears albums